"I Had a Beautiful Time" is a song written and recorded by American country music artist Merle Haggard backed by The Strangers.  It was released in January 1986 as the first single from the album A Friend in California.  The song reached number 5 on the Billboard Hot Country Singles & Tracks chart.

Personnel
Merle Haggard– vocals, guitar, fiddle

The Strangers:
Roy Nichols – guitar
Norman Hamlet – steel guitar, dobro
Clint Strong – guitar
Mark Yeary – keyboards
Dennis Hromek – bass
Biff Adam – drums
Jimmy Belken – fiddle
Don Markham – trumpet, saxophone
Gary Church – trombone, trumpet

Chart performance

References

1986 singles
1986 songs
Merle Haggard songs
Songs written by Merle Haggard
Epic Records singles